Kiedroń (archaic feminine: Kiedroniowa) is a Polish surname. Notable people with the surname include:

 Józef Kiedroń (1879–1932), Polish mining engineer and politician
 Zofia Kirkor-Kiedroniowa (1872–1952), Polish activist

Polish-language surnames